The Queensgate shopping centre is located in the centre of the UK city of Peterborough, in Cambridgeshire. It contains over 100 stores and parking for 2,300 cars in four onsite multi-storey car parks. Queensgate bus station is located within the shopping centre and only a short walk from Peterborough railway station. Peterborough Shop Mobility provide wheelchairs and electric scooters to help those with limited mobility. The centre was opened by Queen Beatrix of the Netherlands on 9 March 1982.

History
Peterborough was designated a new town in 1967 and the Peterborough Development Corporation decided to construct a new purpose-built shopping centre in the heart of the city. Planning permission was received in the late summer of 1976 and in November the retailer John Lewis Partnership announced that it had agreed to be the anchor shop in the new development. The opening of John Lewis store in Peterborough marked the company's return to the city after an absence of over twenty-five years. Until 1956, when the two main blocks of the building were completely destroyed by fire, the John Lewis Partnership had a small department store in Peterborough trading under the name of Robert Sayle. Originally known as Thompsons, the shop had been renamed following the Partnership's acquisition of Selfridge Provincial Stores in 1940.

John Lewis announced the permanent closure of the store in April 2021, leaving the centre without its main anchor tenant. Today there are still two other anchor tenants such as M&S and Boots (company) which are still open, soon there will be a new anchor for the centre and that will be the much anticipated Empire Cinemas which will open during late 2021 as part of the £60million extension to the mall, this will also include a new food court and several new stores (names yet to be announced). 

In 2005, Hammerson plc acquired a 50% interest in the freehold of Queensgate from Norwich Union Life and Pensions for £156 million. Plans were drawn up for a 646,000 square foot (60,000 m2) mixed-use development adjacent to the existing shopping centre, to be known as the North Westgate Project. If completed, the combined scheme would have formed a single 1,450,000 square feet (135,000 m2) shopping center. Plans for the development were shelved in the wake of the 2008 recession.

In 2011, a £20 million revamp to Queensgate was undertaken, which included the clothing retailer Primark taking over several units and an extension to replace the units taken over. Changes to the car park removed references to local historical figures (Edith Cavell, Frank Perkins, Henry Royce and John Clare) in favour of a colour-coded system, but these were subsequently reinstated and paired with the new colour system.

Paten Bridge, which crosses Bourges Boulevard (the A15), links Queensgate to the station quarter, which includes a new full sized Waitrose supermarket with a coffeeshop and restaurant, built on the site of the former Royal Mail sorting office in 2014. In 2018 some areas were re-paved and a number of shop fronts were updated. There has been discussion of covering the entire street with a glass roof, but the plans have not been finalised.

In 2015, a detailed planning application for a £30 million enhancement of the centre was submitted to Peterborough City Council by new owners Invesco and its managers Lendlease. The plan was to create a 77,000 square feet (7,153 m2) extension in partnership with John Lewis, which has since permanently closed.  The development is to include a restaurant hub and a multi-screen digital cinema. Planning permission has been granted and work is scheduled to start in 2019; tenders for the cinema and the food hall have been allocated.

In early 2020 McLaren Construction Group landed the contract to build the 77,000sqft extension, work quickly began on the site compounds which resulted in half of the bus station being closed temporarily and relocated to the Coach Park just behind The Brewery Tap. Before work could fully get underway due to the Coronavirus Pandemic work ground to a halt whilst everyone in the building trade found out where they stood, after guidelines and measures were put in place work quickly resumed on site with cranes and scaffolding being erected to provide material and personnel access to the roof. In preparation of the extension John Lewis carried out a £21 Million refurbishment project on their anchor store in the centre, part of their project involved giving up around 60,000 square foot of retail space to make way for the construction for four new retail units, three of which will have two floors.

Next has expressed an interest in moving into one of the store which is rumoured to be a 32,000 sqft retail unit directly opposite H&M, however Next closed it Queensgate store in April 2021, and is unlikely to consider a return to the centre. TK Maxx have announced they will be giving up their current store in Bridge Street to move into a vacant unit, on the Upper Ground Floor of the Central Square.

Radio
Independent local radio station Hereward Radio (now Heart Cambridgeshire) broadcast from studios at Queensgate from 1987 to 2011. Queensgate advertised on Hereward with the jingle the capital city of shopping.

Transport
Queensgate bus station is located within the shopping centre and is a short walk from Peterborough railway station, a major interchange on the East Coast Main Line.

See also
Peterborough railway station

References

External links
Queensgate shopping centre

Buildings and structures in Peterborough
Shopping malls established in 1982
Shopping centres in Cambridgeshire
John Lewis Partnership
1982 establishments in England